Eugéne-Hyacinthe-Marie-Joseph-Ignace de Lannoy, 5th Count of la Motterie, baron of Aix and Sombreffe (1684, Brussels - 10 September 1755) was a noble functionary during the Austrian rule of the Netherlands.

Family 
He was the son of François-Hyacinthe de Lannoy, 4th Count of la Motterie and Baron of Sombreffe, and Anne-Françoise of Gavre. Claude de Lannoy, 1st Count of la Motterie was his great-grandfather. He was the brother in law of Dominik von Königsegg-Rothenfels, imperial ambassador. He married Lambertine du Faign, Countess of Hasselt, lady of the Starry Cross. He was succeeded by his son Chrétien de Lannoy, 6th Count of La Motterie.

Functions 
 Governor of Dendermonde.
 Governor of Brussels in 1737.
 Imperial lord chamberlain
 1751-1756: Grand Marshall of the Imperial Court of Brussels.
 Member of the Council of State.
 Field-Marshall, general of the Artillery of the Imperial army
 Member of the States of Brabant, as Baron of Sombreffe.

Honours 
 Knight of the Golden Fleece in 1744.

References

Knights of the Golden Fleece
Lannoy family
Members of the States of Brabant